Silvio Appiani (5 April 1894 – 20 October 1915) was an Italian football forward.

The Stadio Silvio Appiani in Padua was named after him.

Career
Appiani made his debut on 4 May 1913 with Padova in the Campionato Veneto di Promozione. In the 1913–14 season he played 2 games:  Against Petrarca and against Udinese. In 1914, Calcio Padova won the Campionato Veneto-Emiliano di Promozione and went to the Prima Categoria dell'Italia Settentrionale reaching fourth place behind Vicenza, Hellas Verona and Venezia. Appiani was the driver and gunner of the team and scored 18 goals in 14 games. In 1915 he won the Coppa Veneta.

After enlisting in the army during World War I, Appiani died on 20 October 1915 on Kras at only 21 years old due to an Austrian bombardment.

External links
Profile at 100anni.padovacalcio.it 

1894 births
1915 deaths
Italian footballers
Association football forwards
Calcio Padova players
Italian military personnel of World War I
Italian military personnel killed in World War I